6:16 The Genesis is rapper Gemini's first studio album.

Track listing

References

2000 albums
Gemini (rapper) albums